WJW (channel 8) is a television station in Cleveland, Ohio, United States, affiliated with the Fox network. Owned by Nexstar Media Group, WJW maintains studios on Dick Goddard Way (named for the station's late longtime weatherman—previously known as South Marginal Road) just northeast of downtown Cleveland near the shore of Lake Erie, and its transmitter is located in the Cleveland suburb of Parma, Ohio.

History

As WXEL

The television station first signed on the air on December 19, 1949, as WXEL, originally broadcasting on VHF channel 9. It was founded by the Empire Coil Company, a wartime manufacturer of radio coils and transformers.  The station was the third to sign on in Cleveland behind WNBK (then-channel 4, now WKYC channel 3), and WEWS-TV (channel 5), all of which signed on in a 13-month timeframe.

In its early years, WXEL was a primary DuMont affiliate, and later became a secondary provider of ABC programs, sharing that affiliation with WEWS. WXEL also carried a number of CBS programs that WEWS declined to air. Some of the daytime shows originated at Cinécraft Productions on Franklin Boulevard in Ohio City. WXEL also carried an affiliation with the short-lived Paramount Television Network, and in fact was one of that network's strongest affiliates. The station aired such Paramount Network programs as Hollywood Wrestling, Bandstand Revue, and Time for Beany. During the late 1950s, the station was also briefly affiliated with the NTA Film Network.

Following the 1952 release of the Federal Communications Commission (FCC)'s Sixth Report and Order, a realignment of VHF channels in the Midwest forced WXEL to move to channel 8 on December 10, 1953. Its former channel 9 allocation was moved to Steubenville and given to a new station, WSTV-TV (now WTOV); the switch took place only two weeks before WSTV-TV went on the air.

In 1954, Empire Coil sold two of its television interests—WXEL and KPTV in Portland, Oregon, the United States' first UHF station—to Storer Broadcasting. George B. Storer, the company's founder and president, was a member of the board of directors of CBS, and used his influence to take the CBS television affiliation from WEWS in March 1955. WEWS became an exclusive ABC affiliate (and remains so to this day), while the DuMont network shut down operations in 1955.  It took Cleveland under eight years for each station at the time to gain exclusive full-time network affiliations of their own.

As WJW-TV (1956–1977)

Storer changed channel 8's call letters to WJW-TV on April 15, 1956, to complement WJW radio (AM 850, now WKNR, and FM 104.1, now WQAL), respectively. All three stations later moved to the former Esquire Theater building at 1630 Euclid Avenue, near Playhouse Square.

On November 16, 1963, approximately 30 WJW radio and television personalities went on strike, forcing both stations to use supervisory and production personnel in those roles, many from parent company Storer Broadcasting stations in Atlanta and Miami. The main bargaining point was Storer's attempt to institute a new, drastically reduced fee schedule for performers. On November 20, WJW-TV broadcast a taped panel segment that offered the striking performers the opportunity to state their case, since management had presented its side two nights earlier. After nearly reaching agreement on November 23 before talks collapsed, the two sides finally came to an agreement on November 27.

As WJKW-TV, then back to WJW

On November 2, 1975, the station moved to its present studios at 5800 South Marginal Road, which were built with a more modern approach than Storer's usual exterior studio design; the building features a number of columns framed by windows in the front, though the large front was not of the usual Georgian or Colonial mansion-esque design common with WJW's sister stations. While WJW-FM was sold in the late 1960s, Storer kept the AM station until late 1976, when the group sold the radio station to Lake Erie Broadcasting. The AM station's new owners were allowed to keep the WJW call letters, forcing channel 8 to change theirs, per a since-repealed FCC rule that prohibited radio and television stations in the same city, but with different owners from sharing the same base call letters. As a result, channel 8 changed its callsign to WJKW-TV on April 22, 1977. (The added "K" did not stand for anything.)

On September 16, 1985, the station reacquired the WJW-TV callsign (eventually shortened to simply WJW), as  had changed its callsign following the radio station's own transfer of ownership to Booth American Broadcasting (the aforementioned call letter rule was still in effect then). After Storer Broadcasting was bought out by Kohlberg Kravis Roberts in 1985, the station underwent a series of ownership changes. KKR sold the stations to Gillett Communications in 1987; shortly thereafter, SCI Television was spun off from Gillett to take over the stations after Gillett's bankruptcy.

On February 17, 1993, one day after SCI purchased WTVT in Tampa from Gillett Holdings in a separate agreement for $163 million, New World Pictures purchased a 51% ownership stake in SCI Television from Gillett for $100 million and $63 million in newly issued debt; the film and television production company folded WJW and its six sister stations—fellow CBS affiliates WTVT, WAGA-TV in Atlanta, WJBK-TV in Detroit and WITI-TV in Milwaukee, NBC affiliate KNSD in San Diego and independent station WSBK-TV in Boston—into a new broadcasting subsidiary, New World Communications.

Switch to Fox

On May 23, 1994, as part of an overall deal in which network parent News Corporation also purchased a 20% equity interest in the group, New World signed a long-term affiliation agreement with Fox to switch 13 television stations that it owned or was acquiring from one of the three major broadcast networks (CBS, ABC and NBC) to Fox once their existing affiliation contracts expired. The deal was motivated by the National Football League (NFL)'s awarding of the rights to the National Football Conference (NFC) television package to Fox on December 18, 1993, in which the conference's broadcast television rights moved to the network effective with the 1994 NFL season, ending a 38-year relationship with CBS.

At the time the agreement was signed, the affiliation contract of WJW-TV was set to expire on or shortly after September 1, 1994, giving CBS only five months to land another Cleveland affiliate. The agreement with New World concerned CBS executives, as New World planned to switch several of the network's stronger-performing affiliates in other markets to Fox, a move that often forced CBS to affiliate with either a former Fox affiliate or a lower-profile independent station. To prevent such a situation from happening in Cleveland, CBS approached Scripps-Howard Broadcasting in an attempt to sign its WEWS as the network's new Cleveland affiliate.

On June 16, however, Scripps-Howard signed a long-term deal with ABC that would keep WEWS as its Cleveland outlet; this deal also resulted in sister stations WMAR-TV in Baltimore, KNXV-TV in Phoenix, and WFTS-TV in Tampa all switching their affiliations to that network. CBS would reach an agreement with Malrite Communications to move its programming to Fox charter affiliate WOIO (channel 19). WJW switched to Fox on September 3, 1994, becoming the first New World station to switch to the network under the agreement. WOIO concurrently switched to CBS.

On July 17, 1996, News Corporation announced that it would acquire New World in an all-stock transaction worth $2.48 billion, bringing its ten Fox affiliates under network ownership. Under Fox ownership, WJW added stronger first-run syndicated shows as well as stronger off-network sitcoms to the programming mix. It was the only fully network owned-and-operated station among the "Big Four" network outlets in the Cleveland area, and was the only Fox-owned station to carry a historic 1920s three-letter call sign. It remains the only Fox television affiliate to utilize a three-letter call sign.

On December 22, 2007, Fox sold WJW-TV and seven other owned-and-operated stations to Local TV for $1.1 billion; the sale was finalized on July 14, 2008. On July 1, 2013, the Tribune Company acquired the Local TV stations for $2.75 billion; the sale was completed on December 27.

Aborted sale to Sinclair; sale to Nexstar

Sinclair Broadcast Group announced that it would acquire Tribune Media on May 8, 2017, for $3.9 billion, plus the assumption of $2.7 billion in debt held by Tribune. In order to meet regulatory compliance for the merger, WJW was subsequently identified as one of 23 stations that would be divested with Fox Television Stations agreeing to repurchase the station as part of a $910-million deal with Sinclair. Both transactions were nullified on August 9, 2018, following Tribune's move to terminate their merger with Sinclair and lead FCC commissioner Ajit Pai's public rejection of the deal, with Tribune filing a breach of contract lawsuit against Sinclair in the process.

Following the collapse of the Sinclair merger, Tribune Media agreed to be acquired by Nexstar Media Group on December 3, 2018, for $6.4 billion in cash and debt. The sale was approved by the FCC on September 16, 2019, and completed three days later; Fox declined to reacquire WJW after the sale closed.

Programming

Syndicated programming
In addition to the Fox network schedule, syndicated programs broadcast on WJW include Judge Judy, Daily Mail TV, The Big Bang Theory and The Real. The Dr. Oz Show (hosted by Cleveland native Dr. Mehmet Oz) had been on a local hiatus as of December 1, 2021, due to equal-time rules related to Oz's 2022 campaign for U.S. Senate in Pennsylvania as WJW's fringe signal is able to be accessed in parts of northwestern Pennsylvania; the show ended its 13-season run on January 14, 2022, with its spin-off The Good Dish (featuring Oz's daughter Daphne) taking over the 11:00 a.m. timeslot three days later.

Past program preemptions and deferrals
Since it joined the network in September 1994, channel 8 has only aired Fox's prime time, late night, news and sports programming, with the only content it has aired involving Fox's children's programming having been of fall preview specials and network promotions for those blocks that aired within the network's prime time lineup for the final twelve years that Fox carried programming aimed at that demographic. The only notable program preemption outside of the network's children's blocks has been that of the secondary Sunday morning NFL pre-game show Fox NFL Kickoff, of which WJW has declined carriage on the station's main channel since the program moved to Fox from Fox Sports 1 in September 2015; WJW instead airs a half-hour extension of its Sunday morning newscast and paid real estate programming in the program's network-recommended time slot, deferring Fox NFL Kickoff to the station's second digital subchannel.

Like most of its sister stations, channel 8 preempted portions of the CBS schedule, usually the late morning daytime shows. In the 1990s, WJW-TV and its fellow New World stations prepared to launch their own morning newscasts, and as a result, channel 8 began to preempt CBS This Morning as well. The station also gained notoriety in September 1993 by being one of the few CBS affiliates that chose to air the Late Show with David Letterman on a half-hour tape delay, in favor of airing Murphy Brown reruns immediately following its 11:00 p.m. newscast. Despite the preemptions, CBS was generally satisfied with WJW, which was one of the network's strongest affiliates.

As with most of its sister stations under its former New World ownership (with the subverted exception of St. Louis sister station KTVI), WJW has always declined carriage of Fox's children's programming; it opted not to run the Fox Kids weekday and Saturday blocks when it affiliated with the network, airing children's programs acquired via syndication on Saturday mornings instead (the preemptions of Fox Kids by the New World stations led the network to change its carriage policies to allow Fox stations uninterested in carrying the block the right of first refusal to transfer the local rights to another station, restructuring Fox Kids as a network-syndicated program package; by 2001, affiliates were no longer required to run the Fox Kids lineup even if Fox had not secured a substitute carrier). WBNX-TV (channel 55, now an independent station) carried Fox Kids – along with its successor blocks FoxBox and 4Kids TV – from the September 1994 switch until Fox ceased supplying children's programming within the network's schedule on December 28, 2008. On September 13, 2014, WJW began carrying Xploration Station, a live-action educational program block distributed by Steve Rotfeld Productions that is syndicated primarily to Fox stations, on Saturday mornings through an agreement involving Tribune's Fox-affiliated stations.

Local programming
In its early years, the station lagged behind its competitors in producing local programming, perhaps because its studio was located at the transmitter in Parma, while the other stations had studios downtown. A young Alan Freed, previously at WAKR radio in Akron, worked for WXEL starting in 1949. Freed hosted an afternoon movie and performed live commercials for several years before he became the self-titled father of "rock and roll" while as an evening host on WJW radio, before moving on to radio jobs in New York City. Soupy Sales, then known as Soupy Hines, had a weekday variety program called Soup's On where he started his pie-in-the-face routines. In 1961, WJW-TV became the broadcast rights holder of the Cleveland Indians (now the Cleveland Guardians). Channel 8's partnership with the team continued through 1979, when the Indians moved to then-independent station WUAB (channel 43). WJW also carried Indians games that were part of the CBS, and later, Fox network packages of Major League Baseball games.

One of the most memorable programs produced by WJW-TV was the Friday late night horror movie hosted by "Ghoulardi", a character created by Ernie Anderson. Wearing a bad fright wig and phony beard and a pair of sunglasses with only one lens, he interacted with the movies and created an ongoing patter and rehearsed skits during the movie breaks. The program began on January 11, 1963, as Shock Theater and created a generation of fans who could recite catch phrases such as "Turn Blue", "Stay Sick", "Camera Four" and "Ova Dey." Before Ghoulardi, Anderson had a weekday morning program on channel 8 starting in 1961 called Ernie's Place with sidekick Tim Conway (then credited as "Tom Conway"), that included live skits reminiscent of Bob and Ray.

When Anderson left for lucrative voice-over work in Hollywood in September 1966, the Friday night movie slot was succeeded by The Hoolihan and Big Chuck Show—cohosted by Bob "Hoolihan" Wells, who did the station weather forecasts as "Hoolihan the Weatherman"; and Charles "Big Chuck" Schodowski, a station engineer who had risen to director and had appeared in some of Ghoulardi's skits. After Bob Wells departed channel 8 in September 1979, his position was filled by local jeweler and little person "Lil' John" Rinaldi, who had also previously performed in skits on the show. The program was renamed The Big Chuck and Lil' John Show, and it continued airing on Friday nights before moving to Saturday nights in the early 1990s. The show ended its run on June 16, 2007, as Chuck Schodowski retired after a 47-year career at channel 8. At the time of its conclusion, The Big Chuck and Lil' John Show was the last remaining locally produced television show in the Cleveland market that was primarily entertainment; that is, not news or informational (Big Chuck and Lil' John made a comeback of sorts when they began hosting a new half-hour, weekly program featuring their classic skits that WJW premiered on September 10, 2011).

Sports programming
WJW-TV has long history of broadcasting Cleveland sports teams, whether it is produced in-house or broadcast through CBS or Fox.

Channel 8 was one of two stations involved in the deal between Fox and New World which was located in a market served by an NFL franchise that is not a member of the National Football Conference (NFC); the Cleveland Browns—whose games had occasionally aired on the station dating back to its tenure with CBS—are part of the American Football Conference (AFC), which at the time of the switch, had most of their over-the-air game telecasts carried on WKYC-TV by way of NBC's broadcast rights to the AFC (WDAF-TV, located in the home market of the AFC's Kansas City Chiefs, was the only other New World station in a non-NFC market that switched to Fox). Channel 8 first broadcast Browns games in 1956, when CBS (which WJW-TV was affiliated with then), gained the TV broadcast rights to the pre-merger NFL; all Browns games would air exclusively on channel 8 until 1969. Since 1970 (with the completion of the AFL/NFL merger, and the Browns' subsequent move to the newly formed AFC, and with exception of the team's three-year operational hiatus that began in 1996), channel 8 has carried at least two Browns games per year, usually consisting of interconference games in which the team plays host to an NFC team at FirstEnergy Stadium; in addition, with the institution of the league's "cross-flex" broadcast rules in 2014, any games that are arbitrarily moved from WOIO will be shown on WJW if Fox acquires the regional telecasting rights.

Channel 8 was also the home station for the NBA's Cleveland Cavaliers from 1976 to 1980; it also aired Cavaliers games aired via CBS' NBA broadcast contract from 1973 to 1990.

In addition, the station has aired Cleveland Guardians (known as the Indians until 2022) games via CBS' MLB coverage from 1990 to 1993, and since 1996, through Fox's broadcast rights, notably including the team's appearance in the 2016 World Series.

News operation
WJW presently broadcasts 68 hours of locally produced newscasts each week (with 11 hours each weekday, five hours on Saturdays and 5 hours on Sundays); in regards to the number of hours devoted to news programming, it is the largest local newscast output among any station in the state of Ohio, and one of the highest weekly newscast totals of any television station in the United States.

News department history
During its early years of operation, channel 8 broadcast a popular and unique 11:00 p.m. newscast, The Sohio Reporter, featuring a Western Reserve University speech professor named Warren Guthrie who delivered the entire newscast from memory, speaking directly into the camera long before the days of the teleprompter. In September 1963, WJW-TV was one of the first stations to employ a two-man news anchor team, Joel Daly and Doug Adair, in the studio together. The station retitled its evening newscasts as City Camera News, in a format which had reporters equipped with Polaroid cameras to photograph news events, so that pictures could be quickly broadcast when they returned to the studio. Station programming also featured Adventure Road, hosted by Jim Doney, which presented filmed travelogues narrated by the filmmakers.

Dick Goddard came to channel 8 as its chief weatherman in 1966, following a prior five-year tenure at WKYC-TV (Goddard went along with nearly all of Westinghouse's former Cleveland staffers following a reversal of a 1956 station swap with NBC that saw Westinghouse Broadcasting reacquire WRCV-TV in Philadelphia and move the KYW-TV calls there, but returned to Cleveland after only a few months). Goddard said that the incentive for joining WJW-TV was the fact that CBS carried Cleveland Browns games through its contract with the National Football League (the rights to which were ironically lost to WKYC in 1970 upon the team's move to the AFC). Goddard later became the team's statistician, a position he held until 2011. Goddard—who was honored for his 50 years of broadcasting in the Cleveland market, with the renaming of the stretch of South Marginal Road that runs in front of the WJW studios as "Dick Goddard Way" in May 2011—remained with WJW until his retirement on November 22, 2016. Goddard died on August 4, 2020, at the age of 89.

Daly and Adair reigned as Cleveland's top news team until June 1967, when Daly was hired away by ABC-owned WBKB (now WLS-TV) in Chicago. Adair remained at channel 8 through July 1970, when he joined WKYC, which was then owned by NBC. Later in 1964, WJW-TV was the first full CBS affiliate in Ohio, and the first Cleveland TV station, to start local color broadcasts. Following Daly's departure, Martin Ross became Adair's on-air news partner for the next three years, then teamed with Murray Stewart when Adair left. The duo worked together until Ross's death from cancer in April 1973. Jeff Maynor had filled in when Ross was undergoing treatment, and continued in that role for the next four months until Jim Hale teamed with Stewart beginning on September 11, 1973. Just over a year later, Stewart asked to be taken off the broadcast, citing health problems, and was later reassigned to the noon news, with Maynor taking his place on the nightly broadcast. Stewart committed suicide on August 3, 1976, overdosing on Nembutal in a suburban Cleveland motel.

Shortly after the callsign change to WJKW, the station hired former WKYC-TV and NBC Radio news anchor Virgil Dominic as its news and public affairs director (a position which he held until 1983 when he became the general manager for WJKW/WJW until his retirement in 1995), and also began to pump considerable money into its news operation. The name of the newscasts even underwent a transition as well, going from City Camera News to Newscenter 8 around the summer of 1977. Within a year, channel 8 had overtaken longtime leader WEWS as the highest-rated news station in Cleveland – a lead it kept for almost 20 years. Tim Taylor joined WJW-TV as consumer reporter in the summer of 1977, having been hired away from WEWS, where he held a similar role. The following year, Taylor became Judd Hambrick's partner on the station's 6:00 and 11:00 p.m. weeknight newscasts. For much of Taylor's 27-year run as an anchor at WJW (the second longest in Cleveland television history, behind Ted Henry, who worked at WEWS for 37 years from 1972 to 2009), he served alongside several female anchors (including Tana Carli, Denise D'Ascenzo, Robin Swoboda, Denise Dufala and Wilma Smith). Taylor retired from broadcasting on December 23, 2005, after which he was replaced by fellow longtime Cleveland TV newsman Lou Maglio; one month prior, Taylor and Goddard were reunited with Swoboda and former sports anchor Casey Coleman in a special segment during Fox 8 News in the Morning. The foursome has been quoted as one of "Cleveland's most successful news teams" during the 1980s, and helped lead Newscenter 8 to number one in the Cleveland market during that decade.

In 1991, WJW implemented the "24-Hour News Source" concept that was originally developed the year prior by rival WEWS, positioning itself as "Cleveland's Own 24 Hour Newsroom". At that time, the station began producing news updates of 30 seconds in length during local commercial break inserts within syndicated and CBS network programs at or near the top of each hour in time periods when the station was not carrying regularly scheduled, long-form newscasts or the half-hourly updates it aired during CBS This Morning. After WJW became a Fox affiliate on September 3, 1994, the station underwent a major shift in its programming philosophy that more heavily emphasized its local news programming. The station initially expanded its news production to over 40 hours a week, and through the years continued expanding, eventually reaching 65 hours per week by 2015.

In October 1995, WJW retired the "Newscenter 8" branding and the "24-Hour News Source" concept, and adopted a hard-hitting format that saw the implementation of the phrase "ei8ht is News" as the title of its newscasts (the "ei8ht" logo was itself based on a logo used by WJW from 1966 to 1977 that was first used to herald the station's switch to color broadcasts). Consequently, the station used "Fox is ei8ht" as a generalized branding to promote the station's non-news programming, in particular, those offered through its new Fox affiliation (thereby, becoming one of the first New World outlets to fully include network references in its branding). This accompanied a change in format for harder-edged news; viewers did not respond positively to either the format changes, or the constant branding reinforcement (to the point that a story in the Cleveland Plain Dealer began with the lede "WJW Channel 8's constant repetition of its ubiquitous 'EI8HT Is News' slogan has some viewers squawking that Eight Is Enough, Already" ). They instead turned to the more traditional WEWS; WKYC was likewise busy trying to find an audience after years of being used as NBC's 'farm' station. The "ei8ht is News" branding ended upon Fox's purchase of the station, after which it was replaced by "Fox 8 News", which remains in use to this day as the station's news branding.

One triumph for WJW was its weekday morning newscast, as, without a national morning news program supplied by Fox, WJW could produce an all-local, 3-hour-long program to fill part of the time period. Many Cleveland viewers preferred the local show over the national broadcasts aired on WKYC, WEWS and WOIO. This was especially true since WEWS' long-running local show The Morning Exchange was moved to 9:00 a.m. around the time of the Fox/CBS switch. With the exception of a brief period from late 1994 through late 1995 when it was titled Good Day Cleveland, Fox 8 News in the Morning has constantly been Cleveland's top rated morning newscast since the time of its debut. Another advantage of the affiliation switch was the shift of the late newscast from 11:00 p.m. to 10:00, which also resulted in the program's expansion into a one-hour-long broadcast; with conversion of the news department launched six years earlier by WUAB to serve as a joint operation with newly minted CBS outlet WOIO and the balancing act of managing both stations, along with the unproven lead-in of WUAB's new UPN and WB network programming, WJW quickly overtook WUAB's longer-established prime time newscast at 10:00 p.m. without much issue.

In news programming, the station retook the top position from WEWS in 2001. By mid-2002, all of WJW's newscasts placed first. This continued until January 2004, when viewers began turning away from WJW's hard-hitting style to the more traditional WKYC-TV. Even Fox 8 in the Morning lost its top spot to WKYC's morning newscast for about two months. As a result of the overall decline, WJW replaced longtime 6:00 and 10:00 p.m. lead anchors Wilma Smith and Tim Taylor, with Bill Martin and Stacey Bell at 10:00 p.m., hoping the two would attract a younger audience to the program. The change paid off for channel 8, and today its newscasts frequently rank number-one in the ratings.

Notable current personalities
André Bernier – chief meteorologist
Amanda Berry – contributor (missing persons updates)
Kristi Capel – anchor
Mackenzie Bart – evening meteorologist
Wayne Dawson – anchor
Carl Monday – I-Team contributor

Notable alumni

Doug Adair
Ernie Anderson
Vince Cellini
Casey Coleman
Tim Conway
Joel Daly
Denise D'Ascenzo
Bob Franken
Alan Freed
Dick Goddard
Judd Hambrick
Allie LaForce
Fred McLeod
Robin Meade
Bob Neal
Kelly O'Donnell
Soupy Sales
Martin Savidge
Wilma Smith
Mark Spain
Robin Swoboda
Tim Taylor
Mark Thomas
Bob "Hoolihan" Wells
Neil Zurcher

Technical information

Subchannels
The station's digital signal is multiplexed:

Analog-to-digital conversion
WJW shut down its analog signal, over VHF channel 8, on June 12, 2009, the official date in which full-power television stations in the United States transitioned from analog to digital broadcasts under federal mandate. The station's digital signal relocated from its pre-transition UHF channel 31 to VHF channel 8.

ATSC 3.0
The former temporary channel 31 transmitter has remained in a functional, though dormant state since the transition; Tribune Broadcasting donated the transmitter to the National Association of Broadcasters, which it used to conduct a six-month test of the "Futurecast" ATSC 3.0 standard advanced by LG Electronics and GatesAir beginning in May 2015, as WI9X3Y. The transmitter remained active for the duration of the 2016 World Series (which the Indians played in), broadcasting in 4K UHD to the Cleveland area using the ATSC 3.0 standard with Dolby AC-4 Audio (though the audio standard has not been completely finalized yet, with AC-4 and competitor MPEG-H as the remaining options for audio). This station also broadcasts brief, intermittent ATSC 1.0-compatible signals during parts of the day for reception comparisons under the callsign of WI9XJY.

References

Further reading
 Coughlin, Dan (2010). Crazy, With the Papers to Prove It. Cleveland, OH: Gray & Company, Publishers. 
 Feran, Tom and Heldenfels, Rich (1997). Ghoulardi: Inside Cleveland TV's Wildest Ride. Cleveland, OH: Gray & Company, Publishers. 
 Schodowski, Chuck (2008). Big Chuck: My Favorite Stories from 47 Years on Cleveland TV. Cleveland, OH: Gray & Company, Publishers. 
 Zurcher, Neil (2010). Tales from the Road: Memoirs from a Lifetime of Ohio Travel, Television, and More. Cleveland, OH: Gray & Company, Publishers.

External links

Fox network affiliates
Antenna TV affiliates
Comet (TV network) affiliates
Charge! (TV network) affiliates
Television channels and stations established in 1949
JW (TV)
Nexstar Media Group
New World Communications television stations
1949 establishments in Ohio
Former News Corporation subsidiaries